Stamatis Pantos  (born March 22, 1990 in Limassol) is a Cypriot footballer currently playing for AEZ Zakakiou in the Cypriot Second Division.

Career
On 1 July 2019, AEZ Zakakiou confirmed the signing of Pantos.

References

External links

1990 births
Living people
Cypriot footballers
Association football forwards
Cyprus under-21 international footballers
Cyprus youth international footballers
Apollon Limassol FC players
APEP FC players
AEK Kouklia F.C. players
Nea Salamis Famagusta FC players
Pafos FC players
Cypriot First Division players
Cypriot Second Division players
Karmiotissa FC players
Akritas Chlorakas players
AEZ Zakakiou players